Operation Lucky Alphonse was a British Armed Forces operation that occurred during the EOKA insurgency in Cyprus. The British Army lost 25 men.

Units
Units already stationed in the Troodos Area
The Parachute Regiment
The Royal Marines
The Gordon Highlanders
Supporting Units
The King's Own Yorkshire Light Infantry
The South Staffordshire Regiment
The Royal Norfolk Regiment
The Royal Horse Guards
The RAF Regiment
HMS Diamond
C Company of the 1st Battalion, The Highland Light Infantry

References

David Carter, The Tragedy of Lucky Alphonse (The Paphos Fire), Britain's Small Wars, 2005

See also
Modern history of Cyprus

Lucky Alphonse
Cyprus Emergency
1956 in Cyprus
June 1956 events in Europe